This is a list of members of the Western Australian Legislative Council from 22 May 1918 to 21 May 1920. The chamber had 30 seats made up of ten provinces each electing three members, on a system of rotation whereby one-third of the members would retire at each biennial election.

Notes
 On 17 April 1919, East Province Country LC Charles Baxter was appointed Minister for Agriculture in the new Ministry led by Hal Colebatch. He was therefore required to resign and contest a ministerial by-election, at which he was returned unopposed on 3 May 1919.
 On 8 June 1919, West Province Nationalist MLC Sir Henry Briggs died. Labor candidate Alexander Panton won the resulting by-election on 5 July 1919.
 On 13 October 1919, Metropolitan Province Independent MLC Henry Saunders died. Nationalist candidate Arthur Lovekin won the resulting by-election on 15 November 1919.

Sources
 
 
 

Members of Western Australian parliaments by term